Eupithecia phyllisae is a moth in the family Geometridae first described by Rindge in 1963. It is found in the US states of New Mexico and Arizona.

The length of the forewings is 7-8.5 mm for males and 7–9 mm for females. The forewing ground color is pale grayish white, heavily overlain with pale reddish-brown scales. The upper
portion of the median area is broadly grayish black. The hindwings are concolorous with the forewings, but with a sinuate, grayish-black median band and a brownish-red extradiscal band, separated by a prominent stripe of the ground color.

Etymology
The species is named in honor of the wife of the author, Phyllis Rindge.

References

Moths described in 1963
phyllisae
Moths of North America